Hypocala florens is a moth of the family Erebidae.

Distribution
It is known from Madagascar and La Réunion

References

External links
- Drlegrain.be: picture of Hypocala florens

Hypocalinae
Moths of Madagascar
Moths of Réunion